Wonderful Life (U.S.: Swingers' Paradise) is a 1964 British film made as a vehicle for pop star Cliff Richard. It is the third in a series of film musicals following The Young Ones (1961) and Summer Holiday (1963).

Written by Peter Myers and Ronald Cass, directed by Sidney J. Furie, choreographed by Gillian Lynne, It also stars Walter Slezak, Susan Hampshire and The Shadows and features  Melvyn Hayes, Richard O'Sullivan, Una Stubbs, Derek Bond and Gerald Harper. The movie was filmed in Las Palmas de Gran Canaria city in Spain, and the "desert" scenes shot on Maspalomas sand dunes on Gran Canaria island, Canary Islands.

Plot
Jonnie and his bandmates work as waiters on a travelling ferry. Through a pyrotechnics accident, the power cuts on the ferry and the group are fired on the spot, stranded on a tiny boat with nothing but their instruments. They float around in the Atlantic Ocean until they reach the Canary Islands.

The group ends up in a sand dune, miserable and confused, wondering what to do next. They are briefly confused by a mirage of a ferry but then decide to set off again in the direction they were originally heading. Jonnie spots a figure on an out-of-control camel and rushes to save her, but discovers that he had accidentally ruined a scene being filmed for a movie. Despite the disruption, director Lloyd Davis offers him a job as a stunt double and gives the rest of Jonnie's group jobs as runners.

Later that evening, Jonnie spots a blonde woman sitting at his opposite table reading from a script. Her name is Jenny and she doesn't believe that she is a good enough actress to be the leading lady. Jonnie tells her to ignore the cameras and the crew watching her, and imagine that she isn't acting. The advice does not help her and Lloyd regrets hiring her.

Jonnie's band realise they could cheer everyone up by making the movie a musical, disguising their spare camera behind various objects. The group race through the filming under Lloyd and Jenny's noses, filming a musical number by telling Jenny to sing her script along with the music secretly played by Jonnie's band hiding behind a wall. They are caught by an eavesdropping Lloyd who threatens to fire them, but Jonnie convinces him not to. Lloyd smugly tells him that he will allow them to continue but not with any of his equipment. Jonnie and his friends decide to film when the actual team is not around to witness, and borrow a camera, but worry about filming the finale without Jenny's knowledge. In a restaurant, they discuss their plans and make jokes at Lloyd's expense, unaware that Lloyd and Jenny are on an adjacent table. Lloyd, who is revealed as Jenny's father, vows to stop them and orders Jenny not to go on set the next day.

Jonnie finds Jenny at the nearest swimming pool and begs her to help them. She agrees, snapping that she never wants to see him again. When filming is over, Lloyd is disappointed that his final cut for the film isn't up to his standard and Jonnie isn't happy about the musical adaptation either. They decide to join forces and combine their movies, rewriting the tale as a story about two brothers and a princess. It is shown at the movie premiere and the audience's reception is positive. Lloyd expresses his gratitude to Jonnie during the applause and tells him that Jenny wants to marry him.

Cast
Cliff Richard as Johnnie
Walter Slezak as Lloyd Davis
Susan Hampshire as Jenny Taylor
Hank Marvin as Hank (The Shadows)
Bruce Welch as Bruce (The Shadows)
Brian Bennett as Brian (The Shadows)
John Rostill as John (The Shadows)
Melvyn Hayes as Jerry
Richard O'Sullivan as Edward
Una Stubbs as Barbara Tate the screenwriter
Derek Bond as Douglas Leslie
Gerald Harper as Sheik / Scotsman / Harold
Joseph Cuby as Miguel [credited as Joe Cuby]

Film soundtrack 
A soundtrack album was released in 1964 credited to Cliff Richard with The Shadows, all the music was produced by Stanley Black

Production
The film was shot in Techniscope, a widescreen filming method which used standard 35mm film, on which two frames of picture occupied a single frame of film.

Reception
It was among the ten most popular films of the year at the British box office in 1964.

See also
Wonderful Life (Cliff Richard album)

References

External links
 
 

1964 films
1964 musical films
British musical films
Films shot at Associated British Studios
Films shot in the Canary Islands
Films directed by Sidney J. Furie
American International Pictures films
1960s English-language films
1960s British films